The 1982–83 NBA season was the SuperSonics' 16th season in the NBA.

In the playoffs, the SuperSonics were swept by the Portland Trail Blazers in two games in the First Round.

Draft picks

Roster

Regular season

Season standings

Record vs. opponents

Game log

Regular season 
Record: 48-34

Playoffs 

|- align="center" bgcolor="#ffcccc"
| 1
| April 20
| Portland
| L 97–108
| Gus Williams (34)
| Jack Sikma (15)
| Williams, Sikma (7)
| Kingdome9,211
| 0–1
|- align="center" bgcolor="#ffcccc"
| 2
| April 22
| @ Portland
| L 96–105
| Gus Williams (31)
| Danny Vranes (18)
| Jack Sikma (4)
| Memorial Coliseum12,666
| 0–2
|-

Player statistics

Awards and records

Transactions

Free agents

Additions

Subtractions

Trades

References 

Seattle SuperSonics seasons
S